Radmila Karaklajić (8 October 1939, Belgrade) is a Serbian singer and actress, Рeople's Аrtist of Yugoslavia, Рeople's Аrtist of Serbia. Karaklajić is most famous for her 1964 release Anđelina zumba zumba (cover of Louis Prima's "Angelina / Zooma Zooma"), which gained her notoriety in the Soviet Union and Yugoslavia. Her career spans over 6 decades.

She studied at the faculty of Western European languages at the University of Belgrade.

Discography

EP 
 Anđelina, zumba, zumba / Poziv na tvist / Selena tvist / Kroz planine na put (1964)
 Crne oči / Kolja / Smeši se mesec / Ja ću te pričekati (1964)
 Nada / Ja nisam više dete / Mi u kampu / Ti, ljubavi, ti (1964)
 Niko mi ne može suditi / Ti si baš taj / To naše mesto / U naše vreme (1966)
 Pata pata (1968)

Albums 
 Radmila Karaklajić (1978)
 Ciganske pesme (1981)
  Радмила Караклаич   (1983)

Singles 
 Ljubavi / Taka taka (1973)

References

External links 
 

1939 births
Living people
Singers from Belgrade
20th-century Serbian women singers
Yugoslav women singers
Serbian pop singers